WAMU is a public radio station that services the greater Washington, DC metropolitan area.

Wamu may also refer to:

 Wamu center, the original name of the Russell Investments Center in Seattle
 Washington Mutual (WaMu), once the United States' largest savings and loan association

See also
 Wamus, a traditional term for an American leather or cloth jacket.